The 1973–74 New York Nets season was the seventh season in the ABA basketball New York Nets franchise. The Nets won their first ABA Championship against the Utah Stars.

ABA Draft

Exhibition games
On September 18, 1973, the Nets opened the ABA vs. NBA exhibition season against the NBA's Philadelphia 76ers. Playing in Binghamton, New York, the Nets beat the 76ers 94–88. On September 28 the Nets again faced the 76ers, this time in Trenton, New Jersey. The Nets also won this matchup, 118–100.

On September 29, in White Plains, New York, the Nets faced the Washington Bullets. Julius Erving scored a game-high 42 points as the Nets won 127–121.

On October 2, 17,226 fans showed up at Madison Square Garden to watch the Nets play the New York Knicks. Erving scored 27 points, 12 of them in the third quarter, as the Nets won 97–87.

On October 7 the Nets took their 4–0 streak against NBA teams into a contest with the Boston Celtics in Uniondale, New York. Erving scored 23 points, but John Havlicek scored 37 for Boston as the Celtics won, 121–102.

Roster

Regular season

Season standings

Schedule

Player stats
Note: GP= Games played; MIN= Minutes; STL= Steals; REB = Rebounds; ASST = Assists; BLK = Blocks; PTS = Points

Playoffs
Eastern Division Semifinals vs. Virginia Squires

Eastern Division Finals vs Kentucky Colonels

ABA Finals vs. Utah Stars

Transactions

Draft and other non-trade signings
 Special circumstance draft pick Jim Brewer signs with Cleveland Cavaliers of the NBA
 Undergraduate draft pick Campy Russell stays in college 
 Head coach Lou Carnesecca returns to St. John's University 
 Kevin Loughery becomes head coach 
 Draft pick Doug Collins signs with Philadelphia 76ers of the NBA
 Draft pick Kermit Washington signs with Los Angeles Lakers of the NBA
 William M. Skehan is named Executive Vice President

Trades
 August 1, 1973: George Carter and ABA rights to Kermit Washington and $750,000 traded to the Virginia Squires for Julius Erving and Willie Sojourner
 September 20, 1973: Jim Ard and John Baum traded to the Memphis Tams for the rights to Larry Kenon
 January 24, 1974: John Roche traded to the Kentucky Colonels for Mike Gale and Wendell Ladner

Awards, Records and Honors
 Julius Erving, ABA MVP
 Julius Erving, Finals MVP
 Julius Erving, All-Star Team, East Division
 Larry Kenon, All-Star Team, East Division
 Billy Paultz, All-Star Team, East Division (missed game due to injury)
 Julius Erving, All-ABA Team, 1st Team
 Larry Kenon, ABA All-Rookie Team
 John Williamson, ABA All-Rookie Team
 Mike Gale, ABA All-Defensive Team

References

External links
 New York Nets on Basketball Reference

New York Nets season
New Jersey Nets seasons
New York Nets
New York Nets
American Basketball Association championship seasons
Sports in Hempstead, New York